EuroShop is a trade fair for capital goods for the retail industry which has taken place since 1966. Held every three years on the grounds of Messe Düsseldorf, the initiator of the fair is the EHI Retail Institute.

Messe Düsseldorf GmbH performs the dual role of the event organiser and host venue, and editions are spaced out every three years. Both trade visitors and the general public are admitted from 09:00 am until 18:00 pm.

Whereas from 2002 to 2014 the fair's overall offerings were divided into the four areas of EuroSales, EuroConcept, EuroCIS, and EuroExpo, EuroShop's new format presents seven different dimensions of retail trade.

Areas 
 Point of presence (POP) or point of sale (POS) Marketing (signage, displays, outdoor communication)
 Expo & Event Marketing (stand construction and equipment, brand communication, communication design, event technology)
 Retail Technology (retail software, POS technology, mobile, e-commerce, payment systems)
 Lighting (systems, design, technology)
 Visual Merchandising (display mannequins, store and window decorations)
 Shop Fitting & Store Design (fixtures and equipment, architecture, store planning, materials and surfaces)
 Food Tech & Energy management (refrigeration, building automation, cooking and baking)

Supporting programme 
 The EuroCIS Forum, in which developments, innovations and trends in the area of retail technology are presented on the basis of current case studies.
 The Omnichannel Forum, which deals with questions of success strategies, challenges and possibilities for new technologies related to digital and classical distribution channels.
 The ECOpark and ECO Forum, an area especially dedicated to energy-efficient retail trade.
 The Architecture & Design Forum, a presentation area for all topics relating to store design, architecture, lighting, fittings and visual merchandising.
 The POPAI Forum on the subject of POS marketing.
 The Expo + Event Forum, a programme of presentations, best-case studies, and discussions curated by industry experts.

Awards 
Six different awards are to be given in the framework of EuroShop 2017. These include the EuroShop RetailDesign Award for the best shops with the most successful concepts, as well as the Scientific Prize of the EHI-Stiftung and GS1 Germany, which honours outstanding academic works (bachelor's, master's, doctoral theses) and is accompanied by prize money totalling 38,000 euro.

International activities 
In 2015, EuroShop established its first international offshoot with C-star – Shanghai's International Trade Fair for Solutions and Trends all about Retail. The aim of its founding was to give interested EuroShop exhibitors a forum in which to present their products and services in the Asian region. In May 2016, 180 companies from 18 countries exhibited at C-star. The fair welcomed 7,600 trade visitors from 77 nations. C-star is held annually.

History 
EuroShop debuted from 11 to 15 June 1966 on the old exhibition grounds in the Ehrenhof. A total of 331 exhibitors from 55 countries took advantage of the new platform to present their products. The some 29,000 trade visitors who attended primarily sought information on shop fitting, the dominant subject of the initial events. The fair was held in conjunction with a congress for ‘modern shops and display windows’. EuroShop was founded in response to fundamental changes in retail trade. From the mid-1960s, self-service concepts became increasingly prevalent, especially in the food retail industry. Simultaneously, the first discount supermarkets, introducing new retail concepts, emerged as competitors to the traditionally brand-oriented supermarkets. To heighten their own profile, merchants were increasingly compelled to turn to new measures, especially in the area of shop fitting.

Until 1972, EuroShop took place every two years. Because innovation in the area of shop fitting occurred in medium-term cycles, the fair was held at three-year intervals beginning in 1975. The EuroShop portfolio simultaneously underwent a transformation. Through the 1990s, further offerings emerged that were of growing importance for retail companies. These included, among other things, promotional design, lighting design, and exhibition stand construction. Rapid developments in the information technology sector brought new offerings in such areas as IT, enterprise resource planning (ERP) and control systems, merchandise security and supply chain management, the lifecycles of which were significantly shorter than those of the fair's traditional offerings. EuroShop responded by creating the annual Retail Technology Forum, which in every third year was held as part of EuroShop. In 2002, EuroShop was fundamentally restructured in order to preserve the clarity of the ever-expanding exhibition offerings for fair visitors. The fair was divided into four overall areas:

 EuroConcept (shop fitting, store design, lighting, refrigeration equipment, building technology)
 EuroSales (visual merchandising, POS marketing, promotional design)
 EuroExpo (architecture, design, events)
 EuroCIS (IT and security technology)

The newly created EuroCIS replaced the Retail Technology Forum. With its overhauled structure, EuroShop has grown steadily. In 2014, 2,229 companies and organisations presented their products and services in 120,603 m² of exhibition space, with 109,496 visitors from 100 countries underscoring the fair's international importance.

Logo 
EuroShop began as a fair for shop fitting and window displays. This can be seen in its first logo, which took the form of a stylised shop and display window. In the mid-1970s, the old logo was replaced by the bi-coloured EuroShop star, which remains the fair's trademark. The logo is derived from the sigma sign of the cash till.

Facts and figures 

This trade fair is not to be confused with the Hamburg-based company Deutsche EuroShop AG (DES) or the discounter Schum EuroShop.

External links

 Article in m + a expodatabase
 Entry of the fair on the platform toFairs.com
 Article in the ERP Retail News
 Entry of the fair in the Exhibitor database

Trade fairs in Germany